Brizio is a surname. Notable people with the surname include:

 Anna Maria Brizio (1902–1982), Italian professor of art history
 Arturo Brizio Carter (born 1956), Mexican football referee
 Edoardo Brizio (1846–1907), Italian archaeologist
 Emanuela Brizio (born 1969), Italian mountain runner
 Francesco Brizio (1574–1623), Italian painter and engraver

See also
 Brizio Giustiniani (1713–1778), 174th Doge of the Republic of Genoa

Italian-language surnames